Francesca Vidotto (born November 22, 1980) is an Italian theoretical physicist.

Biography
She earned her UG/MA at the University of Padova and the PhD as double-degree at the University of Pavia and the Aix-Marseille Université. Afterwards she was a postdoc researcher at the universities of Grenoble, Nijmegen and Bilbao. She was awarded a Rubicon (2012) and a Veni (2014) fellowship by the Netherlands Organisation for Scientific Research.

Since 2019 she is an Assistant Professor of Physics & Astronomy and Philosophy at the University of Western Ontario, where she holds a Canada Research Chair in Foundations of Physics. She is also a core member of Western's Rotman Institute of Philosophy.

Her research explores the quantum aspects of the gravitational field, in the framework of Loop Quantum Gravity. Her work covers topics from the cosmological and astrophysical applications of quantum gravity to the reflections on the nature of space-time and the foundations of quantum mechanics. She is best known for two research directions: Spin foam Cosmology, and Planck stars, with special emphasis on white holes and black hole remnants.

Publications

Scientific book 
 Covariant Loop Quantum Gravity: An elementary introduction (with Carlo Rovelli), Cambridge University Press, 2015.

Main scientific papers 

 Primordial Fluctuations from Quantum Gravity (with Francesco Gozzini), 2019.  
 Quantum insights on Primordial Black Holes as Dark Matter, 2018.
 Planck stars (with Carlo Rovelli), 2014.
 Maximal acceleration in covariant loop gravity and singularity resolution (with Carlo Rovelli), 2013.
 Towards spinfoam cosmology (with Eugenio Bianchi and Carlo Rovelli), 2010.

References

External links
 

20th-century Italian physicists
21st-century Italian physicists
Italian women physicists
women physicists
theoretical physicists
1980 births
Living people
People from Treviso
University of Padua alumni
Academic staff of the University of Western Ontario
Women relativity theorists